Garry & Sheffey was a prominent architectural firm from Bluefield, the largest city in southern West Virginia. The named partners were Martin J. Garry and Robert A. Sheffey, who established their partnership in 1920. The firm was active until 1941, and locally was second only to that of Alex. B. Mahood.

History and legacy
The firm was founded sometime in the early 20th century as Pedigo & Garry, by Garry and Mack Henry Pedigo, a contractor. Pedigo & Garry was only the third architectural firm to be established in Bluefield, after the father-and-son office of W. E. & E. L. Shufflebarger and that of T. T. Carter. The partnership was dissolved in 1920, and Garry was briefly on his own before promoting Sheffey. Garry retired in 1941, and the firm became Robert A. Sheffey, Architect.

Garry & Sheffey and Pedigo & Garry are associated with the design of at least three properties individually placed on the National Register of Historic Places, and their works contribute to at least four more listed historic districts.

List of works

Pedigo & Garry, to 1920
 1909 - Joseph M. Sanders House, 117 Oakhurst Ave, Bluefield, West Virginia
 1912 - Huff, Andrews & Thomas Warehouse, Princeton Ave, Bluefield, West Virginia
 Demolished.
 1915 - Masonic Building (Former), 109 Wyoming St, Welch, West Virginia
 1915 - Scott Street Baptist Church, 600 Scott St, Bluefield, West Virginia
 1917 - McNary & Johnson Building, 119 Wyoming St, Welch, West Virginia
 1919 - Beulah A. M. E. Church (Former), 901 Bland St, Bluefield, West Virginia
 1919 - First National Bank Building, Center St, Iaeger, West Virginia

Garry & Sheffey, 1920-1941
 1921 - Westminster Presbyterian Church, 2005 Washington St, Bluefield, West Virginia
 1922 - Hotel Carter (Tyson Towers), 80 McDowell St, Welch, West Virginia
 1923 - Bailey Building, 704 Bland St, Bluefield, West Virginia
 1924 - Bluefield Municipal Building (Former), 514 Bland St, Bluefield, West Virginia
 With Wilbur T. Mills of Columbus, Ohio.
 1925 - Mingo County Memorial Building, Logan St, Williamson, West Virginia
 1926 - Ramsey School, 300 Ramsey St, Bluefield, West Virginia
 1927 - Elks Building, 405 Raleigh St, Bluefield, West Virginia
 1928 - E. W. Horton House, 615 Oakhurst Ave, Bluefield, West Virginia
 1928 - Mercer County Memorial Building, 1500 W Main St, Princeton, West Virginia
 1929 - Bland County Courthouse (Remodeling), 612 Main St, Bland, Virginia
 Most visibly, Garry & Sheffey added the building's portico.
 1930 - Gordon C. Felts House, 404 N Main St, Galax, Virginia
 1930 - President's House, Bluefield State College, Bluefield, West Virginia
 1931 - Big Creek High School, Center St, War, West Virginia
 Burned in 2015.
 1931 - U. S. Post Office, 921 Mercer St, Princeton, West Virginia
 This building is now the Princeton Public Library.
 1934 - Bramwell High School (Former), Bluestone Ave, Bramwell, West Virginia
 1935- Sidney J. Kwass House, 730 Parkway Ave, Bluefield, West Virginia
 A rare local example of Art Deco design.
 1936 - Concord Masonic Lodge, Main St, Athens, West Virginia
 1941 - Marsh Library, Concord State Teachers College, Athens, West Virginia

Robert A. Sheffey, from 1941
 1949 - Collins High (Middle) School, 601 Jones Ave, Oak Hill, West Virginia
 1951 - Science Hall, Concord College, Athens, West Virginia

References

Architecture firms based in West Virginia
Defunct architecture firms of the United States
Design companies established in 1920
Design companies disestablished in 1941
American companies established in 1920
1920 establishments in West Virginia
1941 disestablishments in West Virginia
Bluefield, West Virginia